St. Ann's Cathedral is a Catholic cathedral in Great Falls, Montana, United States. Along with St. Patrick's Co-Cathedral in Billings, Montana it is the seat of the Diocese of Great Falls-Billings. In 1991 it was included as a contributing property in the Great Falls Northside Residential Historic District on the National Register of Historic Places.

History

St. Ann's Parish
The first St. Ann's Church was financed by three parishioners who signed a note for $3,000. The church was built of brick on the site now occupied by the Heisey Center. The first resident pastor was Father Dols who was also responsible for parishes in Cascade, Choteau, and  Neihart.

St. Ann's Cathedral
On May 18, 1904, St. Pius X established the Diocese of Great Falls and St. Ann's became the cathedral. One of the first tasks of the new bishop, Mathias Clement Lenihan, was to build a new cathedral to accommodate the growing congregation.  Designed by John H. Kent of Helena, the present church was constructed between 1906 and 1907 for around $100,000 ($ in  dollars). It features a cruciform plan, gothic arched windows and a turreted bell tower. The stone for the Gothic Revival structure was quarried near Stockett. It is Great Falls' largest church. The former church building was remodeled for a parochial school.

The current rectory was built in 1931 and designed in a style similar to the cathedral. The old church was demolished and the Heisey Youth Center built on the site in 1936. It is also used as a parish center.  The cathedral was extensively renovated in 1953 in anticipation of the diocese's Golden Jubilee the following year.

Pope John Paul II renamed the Great Falls Diocese as the Diocese of Great Falls-Billings on February 14, 1980.  At that time, St. Patrick's Church in Billings joined St. Ann's as co-cathedral of the diocese.

Pipe organ
The Cathedral pipe organ was built by the Reuter Organ Co. of Lawrence, Kansas in 1929 as their Opus 328. It consisted of 14-rank in two divided chambers and distributed over 3-manuals. In 1995, Meadway & Stettner Pipe Organs of Monroe, Washington refurbished the organ which included adding front expression shutters to both chambers, console upgrades, and tonal revision - but still remaining as 14-ranks.

See also
List of Catholic cathedrals in the United States
List of cathedrals in the United States

References

External links

Cathedral Website
Diocese of Great Falls-Billings Website

Religious organizations established in 1889
Roman Catholic churches completed in 1907
Ann's Cathedral (Great Falls, Montana)
Roman Catholic Diocese of Great Falls–Billings
Gothic Revival church buildings in Montana
Buildings and structures in Great Falls, Montana
Tourist attractions in Great Falls, Montana
Churches on the National Register of Historic Places in Montana
Historic district contributing properties in Montana
1889 establishments in Montana
20th-century Roman Catholic church buildings in the United States